Auraticoccus is a bacterial genus from the family of Propionibacteriaceae.

References

Propionibacteriales
Bacteria genera